Thali Alejandra García Arce (born March 14, 1990) is a Mexican actress who grew up in Hermosillo, Sonora. At the age of 17 she moved from her hometown of Hermosillo to the capital Mexico City. In Mexico City she was a presenter of Nickers, a television program especially for viewers between the ages of 8 and 15 distributed by Nickelodeon Latin America.

Filmography

References

Mexican actresses
1990 births
Living people
Actresses from Sonora
People from Hermosillo
Actresses from Mexico City
21st-century Mexican actresses